General Pico is a city located in the northeast of La Pampa Province, Argentina.

With a population of 53,352 it is the second-largest city in the province after the provincial capital Santa Rosa, and it is the capital of the department of Maracó. The region is heavily agricultural, producing meat that is renowned around the world, and most of the grain consumed in the country.

The crossing between the west and south railroads was a determinant point in the placing of this city, founded on November 11 by Eduardo Chapeaurouge. It is named after General Eduardo Gustavo Pico, who was governor of La Pampa Province for three consecutive periods (1891-1899).

General Pico has a very important section dedicated to factories and what is known as a Zona Franca, a customs-free area where products can be imported and distributed to the rest of the country.

The city has two basketball teams in the Argentinian League: Pico Football Club and Independiente de Pico. It also has its own airport.

Climate
General Pico has a humid subtropical climate (Köppen climate classification Cwa) featuring hot summers and cool, dry winters. During the summer temperatures can be hot, averaging  in January daytimes; nighttime temperatures average . Spring and fall are transitional seasons with warm days and cool nights, and are highly variable, with some days reaching above  or below freezing.

References

External links

 Municipality of General Pico — Official website.
 

Populated places in La Pampa Province
Populated places established in 1905
Cities in Argentina
1905 establishments in Argentina
Argentina
La Pampa Province